Bear Gargoyle is an outdoor 1988 sculpture by Wayne Chabre, installed at the University of Oregon Museum of Natural and Cultural History in Eugene, Oregon, United States. It depicts the head of a grizzly bear with a Kwakwaka'wakw (Kwakiutl Indian) bear mask on top. The sculpture is made of hammered 32 oz. copper over a stainless steel frame and measures approximately  x  x . Its condition was deemed "treatment needed" by the Smithsonian Institution's "Save Outdoor Sculpture!" program in March 1993. The sculpture is administered by the University of Oregon.

See also

 1998 in art
 Kwakwaka'wakw art

References

1998 establishments in Oregon
1998 sculptures
Animal sculptures in Oregon
Copper sculptures in Oregon
Outdoor sculptures in Eugene, Oregon
Sculptures by Wayne Chabre
Sculptures of bears
Stainless steel sculptures in Oregon
University of Oregon campus